John Archibald Armstrong,  (1917 – December 26, 2010) was a Canadian business executive.

Armstrong was Chief Executive Officer of Imperial Oil from 1973 to 1981. He was also a director of the Royal Bank of Canada.

In 1983, he was made an Officer of the Order of Canada. He was inducted into the Canadian Petroleum Hall of Fame in 2004.

He died in his sleep in Nanaimo, British Columbia in 2010.

References

1917 births
2010 deaths
Canadian chief executives
Officers of the Order of Canada